Agrostis microphylla is a species of grass known by the common name small-leaf bentgrass. It is native to western North America from the Aleutian Islands to Baja California in Mexico, where it grows along coastal cliffs, on serpentine mountain slopes, and in vernal pools.

Description
This is a winter-flowering annual bunchgrass approaching half a meter in maximum height. The inflorescence is a dense cylindrical panicle up to 12 centimeters long. The spikelets are yellowish, greenish, or purplish, and very narrow and pointed.

Distribution
Agrostis microphylla is native to western North America: the Aleutian Islands, British Columbia, Oregon, Washington, California and Baja California  in northwestern Mexico.

References

External links
Jepson Manual Treatment
USDA Plants Profile
Photo gallery

microphylla
Flora of the Aleutian Islands
Flora of British Columbia
Flora of Oregon
Flora of Washington (state)
Flora of California
Flora of Northwestern Mexico
Bunchgrasses of North America
Native grasses of California
Grasses of the United States
Grasses of Canada
Grasses of Mexico
Natural history of the California chaparral and woodlands
Flora without expected TNC conservation status